Argyractoides gontranalis is a moth in the family Crambidae. It is found in Mexico.

References

Acentropinae
Moths of Central America
Moths described in 1924